María Antonieta de Bográn (born 13 July 1955) served as First Vice President of Honduras. She was one of the three candidates for Vice President of Honduras with the National Party in the 2009 Honduran elections, and also served as that party's national chairperson during those elections. President-elect Porfirio Lobo Sosa won the election with approximately 55% of the vote. On 2008, before the Honduran Primary Elections, the Honduran National Congress reformed again the Constitution for that the Vice-Presidential charge be occupied by three persons again.

She was the director of institute of tourism during the administration of Rafael Callejas 1990–1994.

References 

1955 births
Living people
Vice presidents of Honduras
21st-century Honduran women politicians
21st-century Honduran politicians
National Party of Honduras politicians
Honduran Roman Catholics
Women vice presidents